BC Transplant Society (BCTS) founded in 1985 is now an agency of Provincial Health Services Authority (PHSA) in the Canadian province of British Columbia that registers consent to be donors of organs for Organ transplantation.

About 300 British Columbians receive an organ transplant each year via the BC Organ Donor Registry. From 2009 to 2013, the province had the country's highest growth rate in deceased donations. While about 85 per cent of the general public support the donation idea, only about 19 per cent actually register. Twelve per cent of organ donors in BC are non-Caucasian donors, a slightly higher ethnicity rate than the national average of 9 per cent.

In addition to managing the provincial organ donor registry, BCTS delivers donated organs within the province and also to other Canadian provinces. BCTS also manages policies, standards and guidelines for transplants and funds regional health programs for pre-transplant and post-transplant services.

Transplant Types 
BC is one of five provinces that have programs to increase organ donations from people who die of heart failure, if the family of the fatal patient agrees.

Liver transplant 
Liver transplants in BC have improved in the 21st century. 1989 was the start of liver transplants in BC. Low performance rates resulted in researcher evaluation. From 1997-2001, 150 patients were declared unsuitable for liver transplant due to five categories:
 unsuitable for medical reasons
 failure to meet minimal criteria for alcohol use
 substance abuse (i.e., the use of street drugs)
 noncompliance with medical treatment and medical recommendation
 and lack of social support.

Locations 
Transplant Centres are located at:
 Vancouver General Hospital
 St. Paul's Hospital (Vancouver)
 British Columbia Children's Hospital

Regional Clinics are located at:
 Fraser Health Transplant Clinic
 Kamloops Royal Inland Hospital
 Kelowna General Hospital
 Penticton Regional Hospital
 Prince George Regional Hospital
 Trail's Kootenay Boundary Regional Hospital
 Victoria's Royal Jubilee Hospital
 Nanaimo Kidney Care & Transplant Clinic

History 
Created in 1985.

In 1986, BCTS was the first organization in North America to combine organ donation registry and transplantation.

In 1991, BCTS established its annual Operation Popcorn project which delivers popcorn tins to appreciate health care workers for more than 25 years.

In 1992, BCTS established Transplant Research Foundation of British Columbia (TRF) with funding and administrative support.

In 1997, BCTS created North America's first online organ registration service for public access.

In 2001, the new government of Premier Gordon Campbell added BCTS and other province-wide specialized health service societies to be agencies of the newly created Provincial Health Services Authority.

In 2012, the province's rate of living(19.6 per million) and deceased(15.2/million) donors exceeded the national averages (16.3 and 13.6 respectively). The BC rate is an increase from previous years. For example, in 2009 there were just 7.2/million deceased donors in BC.

A 2012 Miss Universe Canada winner included BC Transplant Society as one of her charity promotions due to a cousin donating his heart.

See also
 Organ donation

References

External links 
 Official Site

Medical and health organizations based in British Columbia
Organ donation
Transplant organizations
Organizations based in Vancouver